Bioscience, Biotechnology, and Biochemistry is a monthly, peer-reviewed, scientific journal published by the Japan Society for Bioscience, Biotechnology and Agrochemistry, of which it is the official journal. The journal took its current name in 1991.

Scope
The focus of Bioscience, Biotechnology, and Biochemistry is previously unpublished original research results on all topics and fields concerning bioscience, biotechnology, and biochemistry. In addition, articles cover basic and applied sciences regarding microorganisms, including systems supporting their production, and structure. Broad topical coverage includes organic chemistry, bioorganic chemistry, physical chemistry, analytical chemistry, enzymology, biopolymer science, microbiology (including virology), animal science, plant science, food science, and environmental science.

Research applications are directed toward human welfare in general. Hence applications are transferred to industries of fermentation, chemistry and biochemistry, medicines and pharmaceuticals, foods and feeds, and agriculture.

Abstracting and indexing
Bioscience, Biotechnology, and Biochemistry is indexed in the following databases.

According to the Journal Citation Reports, it has an impact factor of 1.063 for 2014.

References

External links
 
 JSBBA Home page

Agricultural journals
Biochemistry journals
Monthly journals
English-language journals
Biotechnology journals
Publications established in 1924
Academic journals published by learned and professional societies